Stranvaesia tomentosa is a species in the family Rosaceae of flowering plants.

References

 Flora of China entry for S. tomentosa

tomentosa